The Goodhue Pioneer State Trail is a multi-use recreational rail trail in southeastern Minnesota, USA.  The  of trail currently exist in two segments, separated by a  gap.  The  northern segment is a paved trail running from Red Wing, Minnesota, to the Hay Creek section of the Richard J. Dorer Memorial Hardwood State Forest near Hay Creek Township.  The  southern section is a natural-surface trail running northward from the Zumbrota Covered Bridge Park in Zumbrota, Minnesota.  The trail corridor follows an abandoned Chicago Great Western Railway segment that was originally built by the Duluth, Red Wing, & Southern Railroad in 1888, and abandoned in 1964 following a derailment.

The trail connects to the Cannon Valley Trail in Red Wing.

References

External links
 Goodhue Pioneer State Trail
 Goodhue Pioneer State Trail Master Plan

Chicago Great Western Railway
Protected areas of Goodhue County, Minnesota
Minnesota state trails
Rail trails in Minnesota